The men's Greco-Roman 96 kilograms is a competition featured at the 2006 World Wrestling Championships, and was held at the Tianhe Gymnasium in Guangzhou, China on 26 September 2006.

This Greco-Roman wrestling competition consists of a single-elimination tournament, with a repechage used to determine the winner of two bronze medals.

Results
Legend
F — Won by fall
R — Retired

Final

Top half

Bottom half

Repechage

References

Men's Greco-Roman 96 kg